Hafsa bint Sirin (Arabic: حفصة بنت سيرين, b.651 – d.719 CE) was an early female scholar of Islam. She has been called one of the "pioneers in the history of female asceticism in Islam".

She lived and taught in Basra. She was known for her piety and knowledge of practical and legal aspects of Islamic traditions. She has been credited with seventeen traditions.

She was the sister of Muhammad ibn Sirin, a man known for dream interpretation.

See also
Umm al-Darda

Further reading
 has a chapter dedicated to Hafsa bint Sirin (Chapter XXI, p. 122-).

References

8th-century Muslim theologians
Iraqi women academics
People from Basra
7th-century Arabs
8th-century Arabs
Tabi‘un hadith narrators

Female Sufi mystics
Female Islamic religious leaders